The Postman from Space is a children's comics series written and illustrated by Guillaume Perreault from Quebec, Canada, and published by La Pastèque. It has also been adapted into a children's animated series in French, produced by La Pastèque and URBANIA, and a French podcast series produced by La Pastèque in collaboration with La puce à l'oreille. Publishers Weekly recommends the comics for children ages seven and older. The comics were translated into English by Françoise Bui. The English translation of the comics were published by Holiday House.

Synopsis of The Postman from Space 
Bob is an intergalactic mail carrier who loves his job. A model employee, his daily duty is to deliver letters and parcels throughout the galaxy—a vast universe filled with bizarre planets, odd extraterrestrials and strange spatial surprises. In a world where even the most mundane task can turn into a crazy cosmic adventure, Bob is determined to achieve his mission to make sure every delivery reaches its destination.

Main characters 

 Bob - postman: Driven, dedicated and sweet-natured, Bob has a tendency to lose his temper when his daily routine is disrupted. He loves his job and he does it well, driven by his motto: “The mail is sacred.”
 Odile - postal worker, mechanical division: Handy, optimistic and adventurous (but also impulsive and easily distracted), Odile loves company and is a lot of fun. She’s the best co-pilot anyone could ask for.
 Gunther - postman: Jealous, mischievous and conceited, Gunther feels misunderstood and wishes the world would see and appreciate his true worth. In his efforts to stand out, he somehow always ends up causing trouble. He lives in the vain hope of being crowned Employee of the Month, when he should really be focusing his energy on learning to accept himself for who he is.

The Postman from Space in Other Media

TV series 
Bob is an intergalactic postman who delivers packages aboard his spaceship. He likes routine and planned routes. One day, his boss tells him that he will have to work as a team with Odile, an adventurer who loves surprises and the unexpected. Throughout the episodes, this unlikely duo will experience all sorts of incredible situations. ICI TOU.TV hosts the series of 9 five-minute episodes aimed at children aged 8-12.

Podcast 
The podcast The Postman from Space comprises 6 episodes of 20 minutes aimed at children aged 6-9 years old. Each episode is accompanied by an educational sheet for use in the classroom.

Game 
In this game, a package has slipped by mistake into the ship of Gontrand, a colleague of Bob and Odile. They have to catch up with Gontrand and intercept the delivery of this package. But Gontrand has no intention of being caught easily. In addition to avoiding collisions with planets, asteroids and intergalactic debris, the player must pick up packages and thrusters that will give him speed in order to catch Gontrand.

Reception 
The Postman from Space is well received in the field of children books. In 2016, the French original version won awards at Salon du livre et de la presse jeunesse de Montreuil and 3x3 Illustration Annual No. 13. In 2017, it also got the award Tamarac Express and made the finalists lists of Prix Bédélys as well as Prix jeunesse des libraires du Québec.

References 

Quebec comics
French-language comics
2016 comics debuts
Fictional postal workers
Science fiction comics
Anime series
Books adapted into television series